Audrey Etheldreda Townshend born Audrey Etheldreda Harrison became Lady Lynn and later Etheldreda, Viscountess Townshend (1708 – 5 March 1788) was an English society hostess.

Life
She was born in 1708 and she was known as "Etheldreda". Her parents were Frances and Edward Harrison of Balls Park in Hertfordshire. Her father had been an MP, a governor of a fort in Madras and in 1767 the chair of the East India Company. She was one of four children, but the others died and she became the sole heiress.

Her husband was promoted to the House of Lords in 1724 despite his father still being alive using one of his father's spare titles. He became known as Lord Lynn and she was known as Lady Lynn until 1738. Her husband paid her little attention as he was devoted to his mistress who had been a servant. He was based at his family seat of Raynham. They formally separated in 1740.

She was then described as "a frolicsome dame". She had friendships with powerful men. Thomas Winnington became her lover in 1742 and it was said that she was the one in charge. He died in 1746 as did the next object of her attentions. She became a Jacobite (briefly) as she admired William Boyd, 4th Earl of Kilmarnock but he had led troops against the king and he was hanged. In 1752 Horace Walpole said that she was chasing Lord Frederick Campbell and after him it was Henry Fox, 1st Baron Holland. She and Fox were to remain friends.

Family
On 29 May 1723, Townshend married Charles Townshend, 3rd Viscount Townshend.   They lived separate lives separating formally around 1740. Townsend died on 12 March 1764. She met her husband on some occasions as their children were George, later Marquess Townshend (1724–1807), Charles (1725–1767), and Audrey (died 1781) eloped and married the soldier Richard Orme.

References

18th-century English women
18th-century English people
1708 births
1788 deaths
English socialites